Aziz-ur Rehman (1923 – September 2014) was a Pakistani field hockey player. He competed in the men's tournament at the 1948 Summer Olympics.

References

External links
 

1923 births
2014 deaths
Pakistani male field hockey players
Olympic field hockey players of Pakistan
Field hockey players at the 1948 Summer Olympics
Field hockey players from Delhi
Indian emigrants to Pakistan